"Te Va Bien" is a song by Puerto Rican rapper Kevvo, American singers Arcángel and Becky G featuring Puerto Rican rapper Darell. It was released by Interscope on March 4, 2021, as the lead single from Kevvo debut album, Cotidiano (2022).

Music video
The music video was released alongside the song on March 4, 2021. The music video was directed by both.

Charts

Certifications

References

2021 singles
2021 songs
Arcángel (singer) songs
Becky G songs
Spanish-language songs
Songs written by Becky G
Songs written by Elena Rose